Parvin Darabadi (1947 —  2017) was a Doctor of Historical Sciences, professor at the International Relations Department, Baku State University.

He is the author of more than 100 scientific, academic-methodological, and scientific-popular works on various problems of military-political history, geopolitics, and conflictology, including the following monographs: 
 Voennye problemy politicheskoy istorii Azerbaidzhana nachala XX veka (Military Problems of Azerbaijan's Political History in the Early 20th century) (1991),
 Geopoliticheskoe sopernichestvo v Kaspiiskom regione i Azerbaidzhan (Geopolitical Rivalry in the Caspian Region and Azerbaijan)     (2001),
 Geoistoria Kaspiiskogo regiona i geopolitika sovremennosti (Geohistory of the Caspian Region and Geopolitics of the Present Day) (2002),   
 Кавказ и Каспий в мировой истории и геополитике XXI века / Kavkaz i Kaspiĭ v mirovoĭ istorii i geopolitike XXI veka,   (The Caucasus, and Caspian in world history and 21st century politics) (2010)

References

External links
 Parvin Darabadi on the site of the Baku State University
Azərbaycanda professor vəfat etdi —  Sovetski dəki yanğında zəhərlənib

Baku State University alumni
Academic staff of Baku State University
1947 births
2017 deaths
Soviet historians
20th-century Azerbaijani historians
21st-century Azerbaijani historians